Epitalara is a genus of moths in the subfamily Arctiinae.

Species
 Epitalara commixta Schaus, 1911
 Epitalara reversa Schaus, 1905

References

Natural History Museum Lepidoptera generic names catalog

Lithosiini